This is a list of notable artists who have worked in the UK garage genre and subgenres, except dubstep and grime as they have their own lists. This includes notable artists who have either been very important to the genre or have had a considerable amount of exposure (such as in the case of one that has been on a major label and/or has had a hit song that charted). Only artists who have articles are included.

Groups and artists with aliases are listed by the first letter in their name (not including the words "a", "an" or "the"), and individuals are listed by their surname.

0-9 
 187 Lockdown
 3 of a Kind
 3rd Edge

A 
 All About She
 AlunaGeorge
 Shola Ama
 Amira
 Architechs
 Artful Dodger
 Asher D
 A vs B

B 
 Katy B
 B-15 Project
 Bad Boy Chiller Crew
 Daniel Bedingfield
 Dane Bowers
 Burial

C 
 Ed Case
 TJ Cases
 Club Asylum
 MJ Cole
 Colour Girl
 Da Click
 Craig David

D 
 Roy Davis Jr.
 De Nada
 Deekline
 Tim Deluxe
 Dem 2
 Disclosure
 Distant Soundz
 Dizzee Rascal
 DJ Cameo
 DJ EZ
 DJ Luck & MC Neat
 DJ Pied Piper and the Masters of Ceremonies
 DJ Q
 DJ S.K.T
 DJ Slimzee
 DJ Spoony
 DJ Zinc
 Double 99
 Dreem Teem

E 
 Todd Edwards
 El-B
 Stephen Emmanuel

F 
 Flava D

G 
 Gemma Fox
 Genius Cru
 Gorgon City

H 
 H "Two" O
 Harvey
 Heartless Crew
 Mark Hill
 Horsepower Productions

J 
 Jaimeson
 Jamie xx

K 
 Kurupt FM
 Ras Kwame
 K-Warren

L 
 Jonny L
 Kele Le Roc
 Danny J Lewis
 Lonyo
 Loop Da Loop
 Lovestation

M 
 M&S
 M-Dubs
 Ladies First
 Lisa Maffia
 Mis-Teeq
 Monsta Boy
 Tina Moore
 Ms. Dynamite

N 
 Grant Nelson
 Shelley Nelson

O 
 Oneman
 Joy Orbison
 Oxide & Neutrino

P 
 Pay As U Go
 Phaeleh
 Phuturistix
 Pianoman
 PinkPantheress
 Platnum

R 
 Romeo
 Roots Manuva
 Royal-T
 Mark Ryder

S 
 Serious Danger
 Shanks & Bigfoot
 Shift K3Y
 Shut Up and Dance
 Mike Skinner
 Smokin Beats
 So Solid Crew
 Aaron Soul
 Greg Stainer
 Stanton Warriors
 Sticky
 The Streets
 Sunship
 Sweet Female Attitude
 Syron

T 
 T2
 Teebone
 Toddla T
 Elisabeth Troy
 True Steppers
 Tru Faith & Dub Conspiracy
 Ts7
 Tubby T
 Tuff Jam

V 
 Armand van Helden

W 
 Terri Walker
 Wideboys
 Wiley
 Wookie

Z 
 Zed Bias
 Zomby

See also
 List of dubstep musicians
 List of grime artists
 List of UK garage songs

 
Garage
UK garage